May Hnin Thwe-Da (also spelled "မည်နှင်းသွယ်ဒါ", "Mi Hnin Thwe-Da"; , , "Lady Soidao") was the chief queen consort of King Wareru of Martaban. The queen was a daughter of King Ram Khamhaeng of Sukhothai. Circa 1281/82, while her father the king was away on a campaign, Princess Thwe-Da eloped with Wareru, a captain of the royal palace guards. The couple fled to Wareru's native Tagaw Wun village (present-day Bilin Township, Mon State in Myanmar), then part of the neighboring Bagan Kingdom.

Her husband later seized the local governorship of Martaban (Mottama). Thwe-Da became the chief queen consort of Martaban in 1287 when her husband officially revolted against Bagan with her father's support. The rebellion was successful, and her husband went on to consolidate all three Mon-speaking regions of Lower Burma in the 1290s.

Thwe-Da and Wareru had at least one daughter, May Hnin Theindya, who later became a wife of Tarabya of Pegu.

References

Bibliography
 

Chief queens consort of Hanthawaddy
Sukhothai Kingdom
Thai princesses
Year of birth missing
Year of death missing
13th-century Thai women
14th-century Thai women
14th-century Burmese women
13th-century Burmese women